Viviane Forrester (29 September 1925, in Paris – 30 April 2013) was an essayist, novelist, journalist and literary critic.

Biography
Born Viviane Dreyfus in a French Jewish family, after wartime exile she married Simon Stoloff, with whom she had two sons. After they divorced, she married John Forrester - they separated after some years, but never divorced. She worked for Le Monde, Le Nouvel Observateur and Quinzaine littéraire and was a member of the jury of the Prix Femina. She became famous internationally with her books on Virginia Woolf (Prix Goncourt 2009) and on politics. In L'horreur économique and Une étrange dictature she criticized the globalisation of capitalism. These international bestsellers in particular attacked the free market dogma, and the resulting alienation and misfortunes for  the unemployed.

She was also a founding member of ATTAC.

Viviane Forrester died Tuesday 30 April 2013.

Awards

She won the Prix Goncourt de la Biographie in 2009 for her biography of Virginia Woolf. She also won the Prix Femina de l'essai in 1983 for her biography of Van Gogh and the Prix Médicis de l'essai in 1996 for "L'horreur économique".
She became a member of the jury of the Prix Femina in 1992.

Works 
"The NS Essay - Work: the great illusion", The New Statesman, 24 May 1999
Ainsi des exilés, Denoël, 1970
Le Grand festin, Denoël, 1971
Le corps entier de Marigda, Denoël, 1976
Vestiges, Seuil, 1978
La Violence du calme, Seuil, 1980
Van Gogh ou l'enterrement dans les blés, Seuil, 1983, 
Le Jeu des poignards, Gallimard, 1985
L'Oeil de la nuit, Grasset, 1986
Mains, Séguier, 1988, 1001 nuits, 1998
Ce Soir, après la guerre, Lattès, 1992, Fayard, 1997
L'horreur économique, Fayard: Centre d'Exportation du Livre Francais, 1996, 
The Economic Horror, Wiley-Blackwell, 1999, 
Une étrange dictature, Fayard, 2000
Le Crime occidental, Fayard, 2004
Mes Passions de toujours, Fayard, 2006
Virginia Woolf, Albin Michel, 2009 (English trans., Jody Gladding.) [Columbia University Press,] 2015.
Rue de Rivoli, Gallimard, 2011
Dans la fureur glaciale, Gallimard, 2011

References

1925 births
2013 deaths
Writers from Paris
French political writers
French literary critics
Women literary critics
French women novelists
French essayists
French women essayists
French women critics
Prix Femina winners
Prix Goncourt winners
Prix Goncourt de la Biographie winners
Prix Médicis essai winners
20th-century French novelists
20th-century French women writers
Commandeurs of the Ordre des Arts et des Lettres